Hermann Michael Biggs (September 29, 1859 – June 28, 1923) was an American physician and pioneer in the field of public health who helped apply the science of bacteriology to the prevention and control of infectious diseases. He was born in Trumansburg, New York.

Biography
Educated at Cornell University and Bellevue Hospital Medical College, Hermann Biggs became lecturer and professor of pathological anatomy in the latter institution in 1885. From 1892 to 1901 he was pathologist and director of the bacteriological laboratories and thereafter was general medical officer of the New York Department of Health. In 1897 he was appointed professor of therapeutics and clinical medicine, and in 1907 associate professor of medicine in the University and Bellevue Hospital Medical College.  In addition to his other duties he assumed the directorship of the Rockefeller Institute for Medical Research, upon its organization in 1901.

Impressed by what Lillian Wald's public health nurses were able to achieve in reducing school absenteeism due to communicable diseases that could be treated at home, Biggs, who was responsible for New York City's health employed nine nurses in Manhattan – the first school nurses to be employed in any city in the United States. This led to his adding public health nursing to the municipal machinery for the control of tuberculosis.

In 1913 he was chief of a board of experts appointed to make an investigation of health conditions in New York State, and in 1914 he became State Commissioner of Health for New York. He was appointed medical director of the General League of Red Cross Societies at Geneva in 1920 and was knighted by the King of Spain for services in preventive medicine. His publications include The Administrative Control of Tuberculosis (1904) and An Ideal Health Department, with C. E. A. Winslow (1913).

In the early years of broadcasting, Biggs was among the first medical experts to have a radio program. He broadcast over station WGY in Schenectady NY on Friday nights during much of 1922, discussing common diseases and illnesses.

Hermann Biggs died in New York on June 28, 1923. He was buried in Grove Cemetery in Trumansburg.

Recognition

After hearing that Biggs had died, governor Al Smith publicly stated, "His death is a distinct loss to the state in a most important branch of its service. In the expression of my regret, I feel that I am joined by the citizens of the state generally."

Biggs' name features on the Frieze of the London School of Hygiene & Tropical Medicine. Twenty-three names of public health and tropical medicine pioneers were chosen to feature on the School building in Keppel Street when it was constructed in 1926.

A commemorative marker at his birthplace in Trumansburg was erected in November 2019.

References

Further reading

External links

 Hermann Biggs Biography
 

1859 births
1923 deaths
People from Trumansburg, New York
American science writers
Cornell University alumni
New York University Grossman School of Medicine alumni
New York University faculty
American public health doctors
Environmental health practitioners
New York City Department of Health and Mental Hygiene